Nakhi is a rural locality (a selo) and the administrative centre of Nakhkinsky Selsoviet, Akushinsky District, Republic of Dagestan, Russia. The population was 415 as of 2010. There are 3 streets.

Geography 
Nakhi is located 36 km southeast of Akusha (the district's administrative centre) by road, on the Dargolakotta River. Natsi is the nearest rural locality.

References 

Rural localities in Akushinsky District